Manchikallu is a village in Palnadu district of the Indian state of Andhra Pradesh. It is located in Rentachintala mandal of Gurazala revenue division.

Governance 

Manchikallu gram panchayat is the local self-government of the village.

Government and politics 

Manchikallu gram panchayat is the local self-government of the village. It is divided into wards and each ward is represented by a ward member. The ward members are headed by a Sarpanch.

References 

Villages in Palnadu district